Crow Seep is a spring in Wayne County, Utah, United States.

Crow Seep was named after Crow, a wild horse captured at the spring and tamed by a local rancher.

See also
List of rivers of Utah

References

Rivers of Wayne County, Utah
Rivers of Utah